Brigadier-General Emmanuel Okyere  is a Ghanaian military personnel and served in the Ghana Army. He rose through the ranks to become Brigadier-General in the Ghana Armed Forces. He is currently serving as National Security Adviser for the Fourth Republic of Ghana under the government of Nana Akufo-Addo. He is an ex-military engineer who from 2006 to 2010 served as the General Officer Commanding the Southern Command. He succeeded Baba Issifu Kamara, whose tenure ended on January 7, 2016.

References

Ghanaian National Security Advisors
Ghana Army personnel